Greg Beals (born February 9, 1970) is an American college baseball coach and former catcher, who is the current head baseball coach of the Marshall Thundering Herd. Beals played college baseball at Kent State University from 1989 to 1991 for coach Danny Hall. He previously served as head coach at Ball State (2003–2010) and the Ohio State Buckeyes (2011–2022).

Playing career
Beals was a three-year letterman at catcher for Kent State, batting .306 for his career and earning honorable mention All-MAC honors.  He was drafted by the New York Mets in the 21st Round of the 1991 MLB Draft and played three seasons professionally, reaching high Class-A and playing on division-winning teams in each season.

Coaching career
After ending his playing career, Beals became an assistant coach at Kent State, working primarily on recruiting.  In nine seasons with the Golden Flashes, the team claimed a pair of MAC Tournament championships and made three NCAA Regional appearances.  He would see 21 recruits sign professional contracts, 36 earn All-MAC honors, and 17 earned Academic All-MAC honors.  He then earned his first head coaching job at Ball State.  In eight seasons with the Cardinals, his teams claimed three MAC West Division championships and the school's first MAC Tournament title, leading to an NCAA Regional appearance.  Only once did his team finish below third in the six-plus team division, also the only time the Cardinals failed to qualify for the MAC Tournament.  This was after six starting position players and a top pitcher from the NCAA Tournament team, four of whom were drafted.  Beals saw five players named All-Americans, 18 named All-MAC, and 15 Academic All-MAC, as well as 20 players drafted in the Major League Baseball Draft.

In the summer of 2010, Beals was named head coach at Ohio State.  He has led the Buckeyes to the Big Ten Tournament each of his three seasons. Beals lead the Buckeyes to their first NCAA Regional in 2016, with a Big Ten Conference Tournament championship, their first postseason appearance since 2009. Beals lead the Buckeyes to another Big Ten Conference Tournament championship in 2019. On May 23, 2022, Beals was fired by the Buckeyes after finishing 12th in the 2022 season. He posted a 346–288–1 record in 11 seasons.

On July 25, 2022, Beals was introduced as the head coach of the Akron Zips.

On January 3, 2023, Beals was introduced as the head coach of the Marshall baseball team without ever coaching a game for Akron.

Head coaching record

References

External links

1970 births
Living people
Ball State Cardinals baseball coaches
Baseball catchers
Baseball coaches from Ohio
Baseball players from Ohio
Columbia Mets players
Kent State Golden Flashes baseball coaches
Kent State Golden Flashes baseball players
Marshall Thundering Herd baseball coaches
Ohio State Buckeyes baseball coaches
Pittsfield Mets players
St. Lucie Mets players
Sportspeople from Springfield, Ohio